David or Dave Elliott may refer to:

Dave Elliott (footballer, born 1945), English footballer and manager
Dave Elliott (footballer, born 1968), Scottish footballer
Dave Elliott (American football) (born 1952), American football coach and former player
David Elliott (children's author) (born 1947), American author of children's books
David Elliott (college president) (1787–1874), president of Washington College, 1830–1831
David Elliott (curator) (born 1949), British-born art gallery and museum curator
David Elliott (director) (born 1931), television director and film editor
David Elliott (musician), publisher, and founder of York House Recordings
David Elliott (poet) (1923–1999), Canadian poet
David Elliott (politician) (born 1970), Australian member of the New South Wales Legislative Assembly
David Elliott (professor), Professor of Technology Policy at the Open University
David J. Elliott, music education philosopher
David James Elliott (born 1960), actor

See also
David Elliot (disambiguation)
David Elliot Cohen (born 1955), American editor and publisher